The 1953 Small Club World Cup (first tournament) was the second edition of the Small Club World Cup, a tournament held in Venezuela between 1952 and 1957, and in 1963 and in 1965. It was played by four participants, half from Europe and half from South America but deviated from its usual double round robin format and featured players such as Angel Labruna, Amadeo Carrizo, Felix Loustau for River Plate, Gerhard Hanappi, Ernst Happel for Austria Wien, Nestor Rossi, Ramón Alberto Villaverde and Alfredo Di Stefano for Millonarios who played his last matches for the club in this tournament.

Participants

Matches

Final standings

Topscorers

Winners

References

1952–53
1953 in South American football
1953 in Colombian football
1952–53 in Austrian football
1953 in Argentine football
1952–53 in Spanish football
1953 in Venezuelan sport